Everybody's Buddy is an album by multi-instrumentalist and composer Buddy Collette recorded at sessions in 1957 and released on the Challenge label.

Reception

The Allmusic site rated the album with 3 stars.

Track listing
All compositions by Buddy Collette except where noted.
 "Tasty Dish" - 5:41
 "I Still Love You" - 3:26
 "Orlando Blues" - 4:37
 "Mrs. Potts" (Eugene Wright) - 3:20
 "Soft Touch" - 3:46
 "You Better Go Now"  (Irvin Graham, Bickley Reichner) - 3:34
 "Old School" (Wright) - 4:46
 "Debbie" (Dick Shreve) - 3:57
Recorded at Radio Recorders Studio in Hollywood, May 14 (tracks 1, 2, 4 & 6), and May 15 (tracks 3, 5, 7 & 8), 1957

Personnel
Buddy Collette - tenor saxophone, flute, clarinet
Howard Roberts - guitar (tracks 1, 2, 4 & 6)
Dick Shreve (tracks 3, 5, 7 & 8), Gerald Wiggins (tracks 1, 2, 4 & 6) - piano
Eugene Wright - bass
Bill Richmond - drums

References

Challenge Records (1950s) albums
Buddy Collette albums
1958 albums